George Martin (1858 – 14 May 1905) was an auctioneer and member of the Queensland Legislative Assembly.

Early days
Martin was born in Clarence, New South Wales, to parents George Martin and his wife Mary (née McPhee). He spent many years in Ballina where he worked as a farmer and also auctioneer. He moved to Childers around 1900 and continued in those trades.

Political career
Martin, representing the Labour Party, was the member for Burrum in the Queensland Legislative Assembly from 1902 until his death three years later.

He was also an alderman in Ballina for many years and Mayor of the town twice.

Personal life
In 1887, Martin married Annie Brown in Ballina and together had two daughters.

A member of the Order of Oddfellows, he died in 1905 and was buried in Apple Tree Creek Cemetery.

References

Members of the Queensland Legislative Assembly
1858 births
1905 deaths
Australian Labor Party members of the Parliament of Queensland
19th-century Australian politicians